This is a record of Turkey's results at the FIFA World Cup. The FIFA World Cup, sometimes called the Football World Cup or the Soccer World Cup, but usually referred to simply as the World Cup, is an international association football competition contested by the men's national teams of the members of Fédération Internationale de Football Association (FIFA), the sport's global governing body. The championship has been awarded every four years since the first tournament in 1930, except in 1942 and 1946, due to World War II.

The tournament consists of two parts, the qualification phase and the final phase (officially called the World Cup Finals). The qualification phase, which currently take place over the three years preceding the Finals, is used to determine which teams qualify for the Finals. The current format of the Finals involves 32 teams competing for the title, at venues within the host nation (or nations) over a period of about a month. The World Cup Finals is the most widely viewed sporting event in the world, with an estimated 715.1 million people watching the 2006 tournament final.

Turkey have appeared in the finals of the FIFA World Cup on two occasions: 1954, recording a group-stage finish, and 2002, where they finished third.

Record at the FIFA World Cup

*Draws include knockout matches decided via penalty shoot-out

By Match

Record by Opponent

Turkey at 1954 FIFA World Cup
Head coach:  Sandro Puppo

Group stage

Play-off

Turkey at 2002 FIFA World Cup

Head coach: Şenol Güneş

Brazil vs Turkey

Costa Rica vs Turkey

Turkey vs China PR

Second Round Japan vs Turkey

Quarter-Final Senegal vs Turkey

Semi-final Brazil vs Turkey

Third place play-off
Hakan Şükür scored the fastest goal in World Cup finals history with a low left footed shot past the goalkeeper from the edge of the penalty box after 11 seconds.

Record players
Seven players were fielded in all seven matches of Turkey's third-place run in 2002. Of those seven, only Fatih Akyel played every minute of the tournament.

Top goalscorers
A notable goal was scored by Hakan Şükür in the third place match against South Korea in 2002, when he scored after only 10.89 seconds. It is the fastest goal in FIFA World Cup history, breaking Czechoslovakian striker Václav Mašek's 40-year-old record of 16 seconds.

References

External links
Turkey at FIFA

 
Countries at the FIFA World Cup
Fifa World Cup